Thomas Losonczy (born July 19, 1953) is an American former fencer. He fenced for the Columbia Lions fencing team. He competed in the team sabre event at the 1976 Summer Olympics. Losonczy also qualified for the 1980 U.S. Olympic team but did not compete due to the U.S. Olympic Committee's boycott of the 1980 Summer Olympics in Moscow, Russia. He was one of 461 athletes to receive a Congressional Gold Medal instead.

References

External links
 

1953 births
Living people
American male sabre fencers
Olympic fencers of the United States
Fencers at the 1976 Summer Olympics
Sportspeople from Passaic, New Jersey
Pan American Games medalists in fencing
Pan American Games silver medalists for the United States
Congressional Gold Medal recipients
Fencers at the 1975 Pan American Games
Columbia Lions fencers